
Gmina Janowiec Kościelny is a rural gmina (administrative district) in Nidzica County, Warmian-Masurian Voivodeship, in northern Poland.

Villages
Gmina Janowiec Kościelny contains the villages and settlements of Bielawy, Bukowiec Wielki, Gniadki, Górowo-Trząski, Grabowo Leśne, Jabłonowo-Adamy, Jabłonowo-Dyby, Jabłonowo-Maćkowięta, Janowiec Kościelny, Janowiec Szlachecki, Janowiec-Leśniki, Janowiec-Zdzięty, Jastrząbki, Kownatki-Falęcino, Krajewo Małe, Krajewo-Kawęczyno, Krusze, Kuce, Leśniewo Wielkie, Miecznikowo-Cygany, Miecznikowo-Gołębie, Miecznikowo-Kołaki, Miecznikowo-Miąchy, Miecznikowo-Siwe, Miecznikowo-Sowy, Młode Połcie, Napierki, Nowa Wieś Dmochy, Nowa Wieś Wielka, Piotrkowo, Pokrzywnica Wielka, Powierz, Safronka, Skrody, Smolany-Żardawy, Sołdany Wielkie, Sowy, Stare Połcie, Szczepkowo-Borowe, Szczepkowo-Iwany, Szczepkowo-Kukiełki, Szczepkowo-Pawełki, Szczepkowo-Sołdany, Szczepkowo-Zalesie, Szypułki-Zaskórki, Waśniewo-Grabowo, Waśniewo-Gwoździe, Wiłunie, Żabino-Arguły, Żabino-Gąsiory, Zabłocie Kanigowskie, Zaborowo and Zbyluty.

Neighbouring gminas
Gmina Janowiec Kościelny is bordered by the gminas of Dzierzgowo, Iłowo-Osada, Janowo, Kozłowo, Nidzica and Wieczfnia Kościelna.

References
Polish official population figures 2006

Janowiec Koscielny
Nidzica County